Scientific Linux (SL) was a Linux distribution produced by Fermilab, CERN, DESY and by ETH Zurich. It is a free and open-source operating system based on Red Hat Enterprise Linux.

This product is derived from the free and open-source software made available by Red Hat, but is not produced, maintained or supported by them.

In April 2019, it was announced that feature development for Scientific Linux would be discontinued, but that maintenance will continue to be provided for the 6.x and 7.x releases through the end of their life cycles. Fermilab and CERN will utilize CentOS Stream and AlmaLinux for their deployment of 8.x release instead.

History
Fermilab already had a Linux distribution known as Fermi Linux, a long-term support release based on Red Hat Enterprise Linux. CERN was creating their next version of CERN Linux, also based on RHEL. CERN contacted Fermilab about doing a collaborative release. Connie Sieh was the main developer and driver behind the first prototypes and initial release. The first official release of Scientific Linux was version 3.0.1, released on May 10, 2004.

In 2015, CERN began migrating away from Scientific Linux to CentOS.

Scientific Linux is now maintained by a cooperative of science labs and universities. Fermilab is its primary sponsor.

Design philosophy
The primary purpose of Scientific Linux is to produce a common Linux distribution for various labs and universities around the world, thus reducing duplicated effort. The main goals are to have everything compatible with Red Hat Enterprise Linux with only minor additions and changes, and to allow easy customization for a site, without disturbing the Linux base. Unlike other distributions such as Poseidon Linux, it does not contain a large collection of scientific software as its name may suggest. However, it provides good compatibility to install such software.

Features
Scientific Linux is derived from Red Hat Enterprise Linux without protected components such as Red Hat trademarks, thus making it freely available. New releases are typically produced about two months after each Red Hat release. As well as a full distribution equal to two DVDs, Scientific Linux is also available in LiveCD and LiveDVD versions.

Scientific Linux offers wireless and Bluetooth out of the box, and it comes with a comprehensive range of software, such as multimedia codecs, Samba, and Compiz, as well as servers and clients, storage clients, networking, and system administration tools.

It also contains a set of tools for making custom versions, thus allowing institutions and individuals to create their own variant.

Release history
Historical releases of Scientific Linux are the following. Each release is subjected to a period of public testing before it is considered 'released'.

Support
Security updates are provided for as long as Red Hat continues to release updates and patches for their versions.

See also

 Fermi Linux, Fermilab's own custom version of Scientific Linux
 CentOS, another distribution based on Red Hat Enterprise Linux
 Rocks Cluster Distribution, a Linux distribution intended for high-performance computing clusters

References

External links

 Scientific Linux Homepage
 

2004 software
Enterprise Linux distributions
RPM-based Linux distributions
State-sponsored Linux distributions
X86-64 Linux distributions
CERN software
Linux distributions